Zhongjiacun Station is a transfer station on Line 4 and Line 6 of the Wuhan Metro. It entered revenue service on December 28, 2014. It is located between Hanyang Avenue and Yingwu Avenue (literally "Parrot Avenue") in Hanyang District.

When Line 6 opened, it became the third station in the Wuhan Metro to allow cross-platform interchange.

Station layout

Gallery

References

Wuhan Metro stations
Line 4, Wuhan Metro
Line 6, Wuhan Metro
Railway stations in China opened in 2014